Jason Mims is an American soccer coach.

Playing career 
Mims grew up in Memphis, Tennessee. He then attended Saint Louis Billikens men's soccer in St. Louis, Missouri, where he was a four-year starting midfielder from 1995–1999. Mims then played one year of professional soccer for the Cincinnati Riverhawks where he made 10 appearances and scored 2 goals.

Coaching career

College career 
After Mims retired from professional soccer he was hired as an assistant for the Creighton Bluejays. He spent nine years with Creighton before he was hired by the Omaha Mavericks as the first head coach in their soccer program's history. While there he brought the program national success, until leaving in mid-2018 for a spot in the Real Salt Lake academy system.

Real Salt Lake Academy 
Mims accepted a position working with the Real Salt Lake academy. While there he primarily worked with the U-18 and U-19 development teams. Moreover, when the head coach of the Salt Lake reserve team, Real Monarchs, left the team, Mims joined as an assistant to Jámison Olave.

Union Omaha 
On May 7, 2019, Mims was announced as the head coach of the new USL League One club, Union Omaha. Mims was named League One Coach of the Year in 2021. On December 16, 2022, Mims resigned from his position with Union Omaha.

References 

1977 births
American soccer coaches
Living people
Lansing Ignite FC
USL League One coaches
Cincinnati Riverhawks players
Union Omaha
Omaha Mavericks men's soccer coaches
Creighton Bluejays men's soccer coaches
Sportspeople from Memphis, Tennessee
Soccer players from Memphis, Tennessee
Saint Louis Billikens men's soccer players
USL First Division players
Real Salt Lake non-playing staff
American soccer players
Association footballers not categorized by position